The Bishop of Gibraltar in Europe, commonly known as the Bishop in Europe, is the ordinary of the Church of England's Diocese in Europe in the Province of Canterbury.

Overview
The diocese provides the ministry of Anglican chaplains, not only in the area of Gibraltar in British jurisdiction but also in all of mainland Europe, Morocco and the territory of the former Soviet Union.  The see is based in the City of Gibraltar where the bishop's seat is located at the Cathedral Church of the Holy Trinity. Between 1993 and 2013, the bishop's residence was in England at Bishop's Lodge in Worth, Crawley, West Sussex (close to Gatwick Airport, to facilitate ease of travel). Since 2014, however, the bishop has been based in Waterloo, Belgium. The diocesan office and administrative team, with the office of the suffragan bishop, is in Tufton Street, London, part of the Church House complex.

The bishopric has existed since the union in 1980 of the see of Gibraltar (founded 1842) with the Jurisdiction of North and Central Europe of the see of London (headed by the suffragan Bishop of Fulham). Robert Innes was commissioned and consecrated bishop in Europe on 20 July 2014.

List of Anglican Bishops of Europe 

(Any dates appearing in italics indicate de facto  continuation of office.  The start date of tenure below is the date of appointment or succession. Where known, the date of installation and ordination as bishop are listed in the notes together with the post held prior to appointment.)

Suffragan and assistant bishops 
The bishop also has one suffragan bishop, known as the Suffragan Bishop in Europe (currently David Hamid) and various honorary assistant bishops from the Church of England and other churches in communion with the Church of England. Immediately prior to the 1980 (re)erection of the diocese and the creation of the post of Suffragan Bishop, the Diocese of Gibraltar and the jurisdiction of Fulham shared a full-time assistant bishop in a similar post – at least Harold Isherwood and Ambrose Weekes served in that role; indeed Weekes became the first Suffragan Bishop in 1980. (See Suffragan Bishop in Europe.)

Edmund Capper and Ambrose Weekes were assistant (auxiliary) bishops of the diocese in 1988; Weekes was still one in 2004. Ken Giggall, former Bishop of St Helena, Chaplain of Sanremo with Bordighera was also an auxiliary bishop (1979–1981). Frank Sargeant, retired Bishop at Lambeth, was an assistant bishop of the diocese, 1999–2008.

Nicholas Reade, retired bishop of Blackburn, was licensed an honorary assistant bishop in 2013.

See also 

 Roman Catholic Diocese of Gibraltar

References

Sources 

 Whitaker's Almanack 1883 to 2004, Joseph Whitaker and Sons Ltd/A&C Black, London
 Diocese in Europe – Bishops

Europe
 
 
Bishop in Europe